Mirembe Hospital is the national psychiatric hospital in Dodoma, Tanzania. In 1927, the British colonial administration built the hospital, which handled mental patients from all over the Tanganyika Territory.

References

Hospital buildings completed in 1955
Buildings and structures in Dodoma
Hospitals established in 1927
Psychiatric hospitals in Tanzania
1927 establishments in Tanganyika

Hospitals in Tanzania